The 2017 Mr Green Sport Players Championship Finals was the tenth edition of the PDC darts tournament, the Players Championship Finals, which saw for the second time the top 64 players from the 22 Players Championship events of 2017 taking part. The tournament took place from 24–26 November 2017 at Butlin's Minehead in Minehead, England.

Sixteen time world champion Phil Taylor and nine time major finalist Terry Jenkins were notable absences at the tournament after not playing in enough Players Championship events to qualify.

Michael van Gerwen was the defending champion after beating Dave Chisnall 11–3 in the 2016 final, and he defended his title by defeating Jonny Clayton 11–2 in the final.

Following Rob Cross' defeat by Jonny Clayton in the semi-finals, it was the first time since 2012 that the #1 seed did not win the tournament.

Prize money 
The 2017 Players Championship Finals had a total prize fund of £460,000, an increase of £60,000 from last year's tournament, with the winner's prize increasing from £75,000 to £100,000. The following is the breakdown of the fund:

Qualification 
The top 64 players from the Players Championships Order of Merit, which is solely based on prize money won in the twenty-two Players Championships events during the season, qualified for the tournament.

Top 64 in the Players Championship Order of Merit

Draw 
There was no draw held, all players were put in a fixed bracket by their seeding positions.

Finals

Top half

Section 1

Section 2

Bottom half

Section 3

Section 4

References 

Players Championship Finals
Players
Players
Minehead
Sports competitions in Somerset
2010s in Somerset
Players